The following is a list of important artists, including visual arts, poets and musicians, who were born in Iraq, active in Iraq or whose body of work is primarily concerned with Iraqi themes or subject matter.

Note: This article uses Arabic naming customs: the name "al" (which means 'from a certain place') or "ibn" or "ben" (which means 'son of') are not used for alphabetical indexing. Artists are listed alphabetically by their paternal family name. For example, the Iraqi artist Hashem Muhammad al-Baghdadi, is listed under "B" for Baghdadi, the paternal family name while the artist Zigi Ben-Haim, is listed under "H" for Haim.

A
Faraj Abbo (1921-1984)  artist, theatre director, designer, author and educator
Firyal Al-Adhamy (also known as Ferial al-Althami) (b. 1950) hurufiyya artist, calligrapher
 Kajal Ahmad  (b. 1967 Kirkuk) Kurdish-Iraqi poet
Najiba Ahmad (b. 1954) poet
Modhir Ahmed (born 1956), visual artist
Sadik Kwaish Alfraji (b. Baghdad, 1960), multi-media artist, photographer, animator, video producer and installation artist
M.J. Alhabeeb (born 1954), calligrapher and painter 
Ayad Alkadhi (born 1971), visual artist
Rheim Alkadhi (b. 1973) multidisciplinary artist
Sama Alshaibi (b. 1973) Media artist (video, photography)  and installation artist
Usama Alshaibi (b. 1969) filmmaker and painter
Jananne Al-Ani (b. 1966) Iraqi-Irish photographer and film-maker
Latif al-Ani (b. 1932) photographer, known as the 'father of Iraqi photography' 
Zahroun Amara, world renowned Mandaean niello silversmith. People that are known to have owned his silver nielloware include Stanley Maude, Winston Churchill, Bahrain royal family, Egyptian King Farouk, Iraqi royal family including kings Faisal I and Ghazi, and British royal family including the Prince of Wales who became Edward VIII.
Sinan Antoon (b. 1967) poet
Layla Al-Attar (1944-1993), artist and painter
Suad al-Attar (born 1942), painter
Halla Ayla (born 1957), photographer, painter
Apo Avedissian (b. 1990) filmmaker, painter, photographer, and writer
Dia Azzawi (b. 1939) painter active in Iraq and London
Fadhil Al Azzawi (born 1940), 20th century poet

B
 Hashem Muhammad al-Baghdadi (1917-1973) calligrapher
 Niazi Mawlawi Baghdadi  - nineteenth century painter, decorator and calligrapher
Ahmed Al Bahrani (b. 1965) sculptor
Ala Bashir (born 1939), painter, sculptor and plastic surgeon
Basil Al Bayati (b. 1946) architect and designer
Wafaa Bilal (b. 1966), performance artist, author and educator

C
Wasma'a Khalid Chorbachi (born 1944), Iraqi-American ceramist, calligrapher, painter
 Kamil Chadirji (1897-1968),  photographer
Rifa'at Chadirchi (1926-2020) Iraqi architect (son of photographer, Kamil Chardirji)

D
 Issa Hanna Dabish (1919-2009) pioneer painter
 Murad al-Daghistani (b. 1917 Mosul, Iraq - 1984) pioneering photographer
 Salim al-Dabbagh (b. 1941) artist and print-maker
Bassem Hamad al-Dawiri (died 2007), sculptor and artist
 Hafidh al-Droubi (1914-1991) (also given as Hafid or Hafez Drubi) (1914-1991) painter and educator

E
Enheduanna 23rd century BCE poetess, wrote on Cuneiform tablets 
Ali Eyal (b. 1994) multi-media artist and painter

F
Lisa Fattah (1941–1992), German-born painter, wife of Ismail Fatah al-Turk, active in Iraq
Fuzûlî (Muhammad bin Suleyman)  15th century poet
Mun'im Furat (1900-1972) sculptor

H
Abdulameer Yousef Habeeb (b. ?) calligrapher
Mohammed Saeed Al-Habboubi (1849- 1915)   poet
Zaha Hadid (1950-2016), Iraqi-British architect
Asim Abdul Hafid (1886 - ?)
Kadhim Hayder (alternatives: Kazem Haider, Kadhim Haydar) (1932- 1985), artist, poet, author, stage-set designer, educator
Zigi Ben-Haim (b. 1945) sculptor and painter
Mansur Al-Hallaj 9th century Sufi poet and mystic 
Jamil Hamoudi, (1924-2003), sculptor, painter and author
Choman Hardi (born 1974), poet, translator and painter
Faeq Hassan (1914–1990), painter
Mohammed Ghani Hikmat (1929–2011), sculptor

J
Jabra Ibrahim Jabra (1920-1994) painter, art historian, art critic and author
Khalid al-Jader (1922-1988) painter, educator, art historian and author
Muhammad Mahdi Al-Jawahiri (1899–1997)  poet
Koutaiba Al Janabi (?-?) film-maker and photographer
Amal al-Jubouri (b. 1967) poet
Jamal Jumá poet
Saleh al-Jumai'e (b. 1939) (alternative: Salih al-Jumaie) contemporary artist

K
Nida Kadhim (b. 1937) sculptor
Hayv Kahraman (born 1981) painter and sculptor
Farouk Kaspaules (born ?) artist
Hashim al-Khattat, "Hashim the Calligrapher," (1917-1973) calligrapher, considered as the last of the classical calligraphers  
Rachel Khedoori (born 1964) Australian-born artist of Iraqi heritage (twin sister of Toba Khedoori)
Toba Khedoori (born 1964), Australian-born artist of Iraqi heritage, known primarily for highly detailed mixed-media paintings (twin sister of Rachel Khedoori)
Paulus Khofri (1923–2000), composer, lyricist and painter
Nedim Kufi (b. 1966), multi-disciplinary visual artist and graphic designer

M
Muhammad Hasan Abi al-Mahasin poet
Alaa Al-Marjani (b.1967) Photographer from Najaf city, worked with AP and Reuters.
Mohamed Makiya (1914-2015)  modernist architect and patron of the arts
Vartan Malakian (b. 1947) painter and artist
Hanaa Malallah (b. 1958) painter 
Hassan Massoudy (b. 1944) painter and calligrapher
Ahmed Matar (b. 1954) poet
Dunya Mikhail (b. 1965) poet
Ghassan Muhsen (born 1945), artist, painter and ambassador
Ibn Muqla (885/6–940)  10th-century calligrapher

N
Rafa al-Nasiri (1940-2013) painter, print-maker, educator and author
Muzaffar Al-Nawab (b. 1934) poet, critic and painter
Abū Nuwās al-Ḥasan ibn Hānī al-Ḥakamī 9th century Iraqi poet
Farah Nosh (b ?) photographer and photo-journalist

O
 Amer al-Obaidi (b. 1943)(alternative: Amer al-Ubeidi), painter 
Mahmoud Obaidi (b. Baghdad 1966) painter, conceptual artist, sculptor, film-maker
Madiha Omar (1908 – 2005) pioneer of the Hurufiyya movement
 Widad Al-Orfali (b. 1929) artist and musician

P
Fred Parhad (b. 1947) sculptor

Q
Qais Al-Sindy (b. 1967), an Iraqi contemporary artist and painter.

R
Husain al-Radi (1924–1963), politician, poet, and painter
Nuha al-Radi (1941-2004), diarist, ceramicist, painter
Khaled al-Rahal (1926-1987), sculptor and painter
Nadhim Ramzi (1928–2013) artist and graphic designer
Abdul Qadir Al Rassam (1882–1952), painter
Wafaa Abed Al Razzaq (b. 1952) poet

S
Miran al-Saadi (b. 1934) sculptor
Mahmoud Sabri (1927-2012) (alternative: Mahommed Sabri Said) pioneering painter 
Jamil Sidqi al-Zahawi poet, educator and activist (1863–1936) 
Ahmed Al Safi  (born 1971), sculptor
Shakir Hassan Al Said (1925–2004), painter, art historian, art critic, educator and prolific author
Issam al-Said (1938-1988) painter, print-maker, designer, etcher, architect, philosopher and author
Muhammad Sa'id al-Sakkar
Jawad Saleem (also given as Jawed Salim or Joad Salim) (1920–1961), sculptor
Su'ad Salim (b. 1918) 
Tamara Salman 20th century designer
Lorna Selim (1928- 2012)  artist and English-born wife of Jawad Saleem
Naziha Salim (1927–2008), artist and painter (sister of Jawad Saleem)
Mohammed Hajji Selim (1883-1941) painter, father of  Suad Salim, Jawad Saleem, Naziha Salim and Nizarre Selim
Badr Shakir al-Sayyab (1926-1964) poet
Andy Shallal (born 1969) artist and activist 
Naseer Shamma (b. 1963) musician and singer
Walid Siti (b. 1954)
Vian Sora (born 1976), painter

T
Ali Talib (b. 1944), painter
Aatqall Taúaa (b. ?) sculptor and author
Ismail Fatah Al Turk (1934–2004), painter and sculptor

W
Yahya Al-Wasiti, 13th century illustrator

Y
Nazar Yahya (b. 1963), Iraqi-American etcher, sculptor (in metal), installation artist and photographer
Saadi Yousef (b. 1934, near Basra), poet, author and journalist
Yaqut al-Musta'simi 13th-century calligrapher

Z
Khalil al-Zahawi (1946-2007), calligrapher 
Muqbil Al-Zahawi (b. 1935), ceramicist
Salim Mohammed Saleh Zaki painter 
Haifa Zangana (born 1950), novelist, author and artist

See also

 Baghdad School
 Hurufiyya movement
 Iraqi art
 Islamic art
 Islamic architecture
 Islamic calligraphy
 List of Iraqi women artists

Major Iraqi public artworks
 Al-Shaheed Monument. Baghdad
 The Monument to the Unknown Soldier, Baghdad
 Victory Arch, Baghdad

References

Further reading
Benezit Dictionary of Asian Artists, Oxford University Press, 2017 
Bloom, J. and Blair, S.S. (eds), Grove Encyclopedia of Islamic Art & Architecture, Vols 1–3, Oxford University Press, 2009
Davis, B., "The Iraqi Century of Art," Artnet Magazine, July, 2008, Online
Dougherty, B.K. and Ghareeb, E.A., Historical Dictionary of Iraq, Scarecrow Press, 2013
Farhat, Maymanah, "Iraqi Artists in Exile," Selections magazine, no. 30, 2015 Online
Hann, G., Dabrowska, K. and Greaves, T.T., Iraq: The Ancient Sites and Iraqi Kurdistan, Bradt Travel Guides, 2015, pp 29–32
Jabra, I.J., The Grass Roots of Art in Iraq, Waisit Graphic and Publishing, 1983, Online: 
Khalil, S. and Makiya, K., The Monument: Art, Vulgarity, and Responsibility in Iraq; University of California Press, 1991
Lindgren, A. and Ross, S., The Modernist World, Routledge, 2015
Sabrah, S.A. and Ali, M., Iraqi Artwork Red List: A Partial List of the Artworks Missing from the National Museum of Modern Art, Baghdad, Iraq, 2010
Salīm, N., Iraq: Contemporary Art, Volume 1, Sartec, 1977; Mathaf Encyclopedia of Modern Art and the Islamic World, Online:
Shabout, N., "Ghosts of Futures Past: Iraqi Culture in a State of Suspension," in Denise Robinson, Through the Roadbloacks: Realities in Raw Motion, [Conference Reader], School of Fine Arts, Cyprus University, (23-25 November 2012), 2015
Shabout, N., "The Preservation of Iraq's Modern Heritage in the Aftermath of the US Invasion of 2003," in: Elaine A. King and Gail Levin (eds), Ethics And the Visual Arts, New York, Allworth, 2006, pp 105 –120
Tuohy, A. and Masters, C., A-Z Great Modern Artists, Hachette UK, 2015; Al-Ali, N. and Al-Najjar, D., We Are Iraqis: Aesthetics and Politics in a Time of War, Syracuse University Press, 2013;

Artists from Baghdad
Iraqi calligraphers
Iraqi designers
Iraqi ceramists
Iraqi contemporary artists
Iraqi painters
Iraqi sculptors
Iraqi women artists
Iraqi
Artists